Annabel Sutherland (born 12 October 2001) is an Australian cricketer who plays for the national cricket team as an all-rounder. At the domestic level, she plays for Victoria in the Women's National Cricket League and the Melbourne Stars in the Women's Big Bash League.

Career

Domestic career
She made her debut for the Melbourne Renegades as a 15 year old, and at the time of her debut she was the youngest player to feature in the Big Bash. She has also played for the Australian under 15 and under 19 cricket teams. In April 2019, Cricket Australia awarded her with a contract with the National Performance Squad ahead of the 2019–20 season.

In April 2022, she was bought by the Welsh Fire for the 2022 season of The Hundred in England.

WPL 
In the inaugural season of WPL in 2023, Annabel Sutherland bought by Gujarat Giants (GG) at the price of 70 Lakhs.

International career
In January 2020, Sutherland was named in Australia's squads for the 2020 Australia women's Tri-Nation Series and the 2020 ICC Women's T20 World Cup. She made her Women's Twenty20 International (WT20I) debut for Australia, against England in the tri-series, on 1 February 2020. In April 2020, Cricket Australia awarded Sutherland with a central contract ahead of the 2020–21 season. She made her Women's One Day International (WODI) debut for Australia, against New Zealand, on 3 October 2020.

In August 2021, Sutherland was named in Australia's squad for their series against India, which included a one-off day/night Test match as part of the tour. Sutherland made her Test debut on 30 September 2021, for Australia against India.

In January 2022, Sutherland was named in Australia's squad for their series against England to contest the Women's Ashes. Later the same month, she was named in Australia's team for the 2022 Women's Cricket World Cup in New Zealand. In May 2022, Sutherland was named in Australia's team for the cricket tournament at the 2022 Commonwealth Games in Birmingham, England.

Personal life
Sutherland is the daughter of former head of Cricket Australia, James, and sister of Victorian allrounder, Will. She also played Australian Rules football.

References

Notes

Further reading

External links

Annabel Sutherland at Cricket Australia

2001 births
Living people
Cricketers from Melbourne
Sportswomen from Victoria (Australia)
Australia women Test cricketers
Australia women One Day International cricketers
Australia women Twenty20 International cricketers
Melbourne Renegades (WBBL) cricketers
Melbourne Stars (WBBL) cricketers
Victoria women cricketers
Cricketers at the 2022 Commonwealth Games
Commonwealth Games gold medallists for Australia
Commonwealth Games medallists in cricket
21st-century Australian women
Welsh Fire cricketers
Gujarat Giants (WPL) cricketers
Medallists at the 2022 Commonwealth Games